Khosrowabad (also Romanized as Khosrowābād; also known as Khowsrowābād, Khusrābād, and Qasrābād) is a village in Vandadeh Rural District, Meymeh District, Shahin Shahr and Meymeh County, Isfahan Province, Iran. At the 2006 census, its population was 340, in 115 families.

References 

Populated places in Shahin Shahr and Meymeh County